Kołacz is a type of pastry of Polish origin.

Kołacz may also refer to:

People
 Agnieszka Kołacz-Leszczyńska (born 1972), Polish politician
 Grzegorz Kołacz (born 1966), Polish politician

Places
 Kołacz, Masovian Voivodeship (east-central Poland)
 Kołacz, West Pomeranian Voivodeship (north-west Poland)

See also
 

Polish-language surnames